Lang & Witchell was a prominent architectural firm in Dallas, Texas, active from 1905 to 1942.

History
Senior partner Otto H. Lang was born in Freiburg in 1864. He graduated in 1888 with a degree in structural engineering from the University of Karlsruhe, also studying architecture. He then relocated to the United States, eventually settling in Dallas, where he worked for the Texas and Pacific Railroad, eventually becoming its senior architect and engineer. Frank O. Witchell was born in South Wales in 1879. As a child, his family relocated to San Antonio, Texas. As a teenager he entered the office of J. Riely Gordon, one of the best-known architects in the state. In 1898 he began work as a designer with Sanguinet & Staats in Fort Worth.

In 1905, the two men separated from their employers, founding the new firm of Lang & Witchell. This firm would rise to become the most esteemed architectural firm in Dallas.

The partnership was dissolved in 1938, when Witchell retired duo to failing health. Lang continued to operate the firm until 1942, when he too retired. He continued on in an advisory capacity with architect Grayson Gill. Lang would die in 1947, and Witchell in 1952.

Legacy
The firm is credited with designing a number of buildings that are listed on the National Register of Historic Places.

Architectural works

References

Defunct architecture firms based in Texas